Eike Bram (born 20 March 1965) is a German handball player. She participated at the 1992 Summer Olympics, where the German national team placed fourth.

References 
 -1.html Profile at sports-reference.com

1965 births
Living people
Sportspeople from Bremerhaven
German female handball players
Olympic handball players of Germany
Handball players at the 1992 Summer Olympics
Handball players at the 1996 Summer Olympics